Celeste Lyn Paul (born 13 August 1981) is an expert in interface design and usability. She is a contributor to KDE.

School
Celeste earned a B.A. in Multimedia from Duquesne University in 2003, an M.S. in Interaction Design & Information Architecture from the University of Baltimore in 2007, and a PhD in Human-Centered Computing from the University of Maryland, Baltimore County in 2013.

Free software 
Celeste participates in the KDE Usability Project since 2004, and designs KDE Human interface guidelines.  She has led the KDE Usability Project since 2005. From 2009 to 2012 she served as a member of the KDE e.V. board of directors. Additionally, she held a seat on the Kubuntu Council from May 2008 to May 2010. She has also won Best Non-Application of Akademy Awards 2009 because her usability work.

Hackerspace 
Celeste is a member of the HacDC hackerspace and was voted in as president in 2015.

References

External links
Homepage of Celeste Lyn Paul
People behind KDE

1981 births
KDE
Duquesne University alumni
Living people
University of Baltimore alumni
University of Maryland, Baltimore County alumni